= Playa El Desnarigado =

Beach in Ceuta, Spain

Coordinates: 35.8949°N 5.2827°W

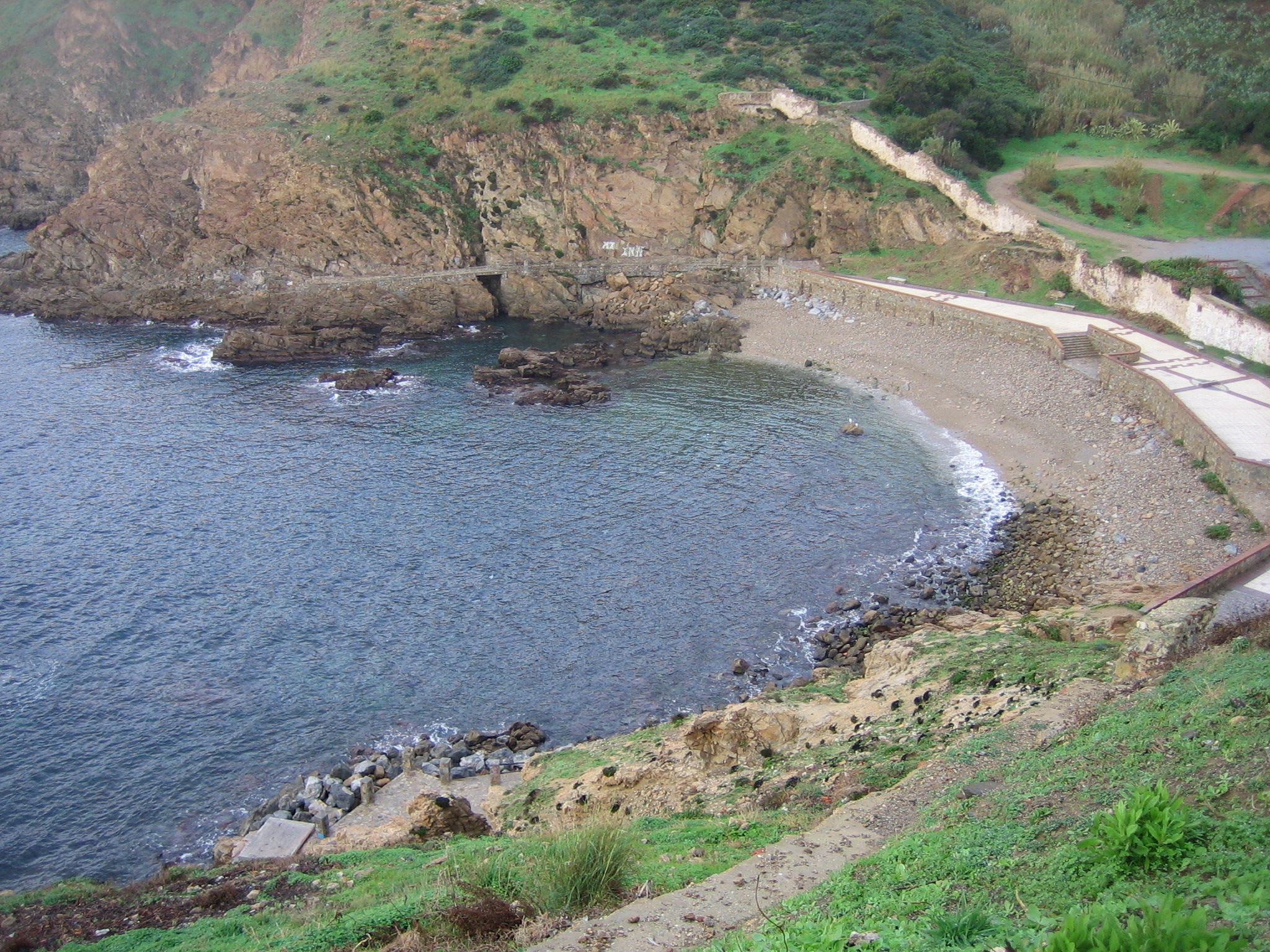
Playa El Desnarigado (2006)

Playa El Desnarigado is a small beach of Ceuta, a Spanish city bordering northern Morocco. The beach is about 80 metres in length with an average width of about six metres.

The beach is named after the Desnarigado who was said to be a pirate. He had worked and then escaped in mines in the Riff mountains. He was named the Desnarigado as this means without a nose which was the method of marking those who worked in the mines.
